Lowson is an English surname. Notable people with the surname include:

Edmund Lowson, English footballer
Thomas Lowson (c.1764–1856), the traditional founder of the town of Carnoustie, Angus, Scotland
Otto Andreas Lowson Mörch (1828–1878), biologist, specifically a malacologist
Sir Denys Lowson, 1st Baronet (1906–1975), Lord Mayor of London and first of the Lowson baronets
Frank Lowson (1925–1984), English cricketer who played in seven Tests from 1951 to 1955
Jasmine Lowson (born 1972), British newsreader

Surnames of English origin